The Legio I Maximiana (of Maximian) was a comitatensis Roman legion, probably created by Emperor Diocletian in 296 or 297 AD. The legion was named after Maximianus, a colleague of Diocletian. The I Maximiana was formed together with II Flavia Constantia, to garrison the newly created province Thebaidos, in Aegyptus. As well as protect it from neighboring tribes. The legion is also known as Maximiana Thebanorum or Thebaeorum ("Maximian legion of the Thebans"). Since no Legio I Maximiana is listed as being stationed at Thebes in the Notitia Dignitatum, the designation is interpreted more broadly as of the Thebaid in general. The cognomen Maximiana originated from Maximian, Diocletian's colleague. In 354, I Maximiana was located in Thrace, in the city of Adrianople. Thus it is likely that it fought in the Battle of Adrianople, in 378, when emperor Valens was defeated by Goths. According to Notitia Dignitatum, the I Maximiana Thebanorum was still under Thracian command at the start of the 5th century, while the I Maximiana was in Philae (Egypt, south of Aswan), under the dux Thebaidos. There exists also a Theban Legion in the legend of Saint Maurice from the 5th century. According to that tradition, this (Prima Maximiana Thebanorum) was a legion from Thebes that was ordered to move by Maximian. Thus it is sometimes related to I Maximiana Thebanorum. However, according to tradition, the Theban Legion of Saint Maurice was martyred in 286, while the I Maximiana was not founded until ten years later.

See also
List of Roman legions.

References and external links 
Notitia Dignitatum, VII

01 Maximiana
290s establishments in the Roman Empire
01 Maximiana
Military units and formations established in the 3rd century